Manuel Luna (born 14 August 1945) is a Venezuelan former judoka. He competed in the men's lightweight event at the 1976 Summer Olympics.

References

External links
 

1945 births
Living people
Venezuelan male judoka
Olympic judoka of Venezuela
Judoka at the 1976 Summer Olympics
Place of birth missing (living people)
Pan American Games medalists in judo
Pan American Games bronze medalists for Venezuela
Judoka at the 1975 Pan American Games
Medalists at the 1975 Pan American Games
Pan American Games gold medalists for Venezuela
Medalists at the 1983 Pan American Games
Sambokas at the 1983 Pan American Games
Wrestlers at the 1983 Pan American Games
20th-century Venezuelan people
21st-century Venezuelan people